The women's 1500 metres in speed skating at the 1968 Winter Olympics took place on February 10, at the L'Anneau de Vitesse.

Records
Prior to this competition, the existing world and Olympic records were as follows:

The following new Olympic record was set.

Results

References

Women's speed skating at the 1968 Winter Olympics
Olymp
Skat